The 1921 VFL season was the 25th season of the Victorian Football League (VFL), the highest level senior Australian rules football competition in Victoria. The season featured nine clubs, ran from 7 May until 15 October, and comprised a 16-game home-and-away season followed by a finals series featuring the top four clubs.

The premiership was won by the Richmond Football Club for the second time and second time consecutively, after it defeated  by four points in the 1921 VFL Grand Final.

Premiership season
In 1921, the VFL competition consisted of nine teams of 18 on-the-field players each, with no "reserves", although any of the 18 players who had left the playing field for any reason could later resume their place on the field at any time during the match.

Each team played each other twice in a home-and-away season of 18 rounds (i.e., 16 matches and 2 byes).

Once the 18 round home-and-away season had finished, the 1921 VFL Premiers were determined by the specific format and conventions of the amended "Argus system".

Round 1

|- bgcolor="#CCCCFF"
| Home team
| Home team score
| Away team
| Away team score
| Venue
| Crowd
| Date
|- bgcolor="#FFFFFF"
| 
| 10.6 (66)
| 
| 9.13 (67)
| Junction Oval
| 15,000
| 7 May 1921
|- bgcolor="#FFFFFF"
| 
| 11.12 (78)
| 
| 12.6 (78)
| EMCG
| 3,500
| 7 May 1921
|- bgcolor="#FFFFFF"
| 
| 10.13 (73)
| 
| 9.3 (57)
| Victoria Park
| 20,000
| 7 May 1921
|- bgcolor="#FFFFFF"
| 
| 7.11 (53)
| 
| 8.14 (62)
| Punt Road Oval
| 32,000
| 7 May 1921

Round 2

|- bgcolor="#CCCCFF"
| Home team
| Home team score
| Away team
| Away team score
| Venue
| Crowd
| Date
|- bgcolor="#FFFFFF"
| 
| 7.11 (53)
| 
| 8.15 (63)
| Brunswick Street Oval
| 25,000
| 14 May 1921
|- bgcolor="#FFFFFF"
| 
| 7.9 (51)
| 
| 11.16 (82)
| Lake Oval
| 27,000
| 14 May 1921
|- bgcolor="#FFFFFF"
| 
| 11.19 (85)
| 
| 10.16 (76)
| Corio Oval
| 15,000
| 14 May 1921
|- bgcolor="#FFFFFF"
| 
| 7.11 (53)
| 
| 14.13 (97)
| MCG
| 14,994
| 14 May 1921

Round 3

|- bgcolor="#CCCCFF"
| Home team
| Home team score
| Away team
| Away team score
| Venue
| Crowd
| Date
|- bgcolor="#FFFFFF"
| 
| 5.6 (36)
| 
| 5.14 (44)
| Brunswick Street Oval
| 18,000
| 21 May 1921
|- bgcolor="#FFFFFF"
| 
| 16.9 (105)
| 
| 13.9 (87)
| Victoria Park
| 10,000
| 21 May 1921
|- bgcolor="#FFFFFF"
| 
| 15.11 (101)
| 
| 11.12 (78)
| Princes Park
| 30,000
| 21 May 1921
|- bgcolor="#FFFFFF"
| 
| 4.14 (38)
| 
| 11.15 (81)
| Lake Oval
| 12,000
| 21 May 1921

Round 4

|- bgcolor="#CCCCFF"
| Home team
| Home team score
| Away team
| Away team score
| Venue
| Crowd
| Date
|- bgcolor="#FFFFFF"
| 
| 10.10 (70)
| 
| 9.15 (69)
| MCG
| 8,892
| 28 May 1921
|- bgcolor="#FFFFFF"
| 
| 11.13 (79)
| 
| 9.8 (62)
| Corio Oval
| 10,000
| 28 May 1921
|- bgcolor="#FFFFFF"
| 
| 5.20 (50)
| 
| 6.14 (50)
| Princes Park
| 28,000
| 28 May 1921
|- bgcolor="#FFFFFF"
| 
| 7.12 (54)
| 
| 9.17 (71)
| EMCG
| 18,000
| 28 May 1921

Round 5

|- bgcolor="#CCCCFF"
| Home team
| Home team score
| Away team
| Away team score
| Venue
| Crowd
| Date
|- bgcolor="#FFFFFF"
| 
| 7.11 (53)
| 
| 6.16 (52)
| Punt Road Oval
| 30,000
| 4 June 1921
|- bgcolor="#FFFFFF"
| 
| 10.10 (70)
| 
| 10.10 (70)
| Lake Oval
| 25,000
| 4 June 1921
|- bgcolor="#FFFFFF"
| 
| 8.14 (62)
| 
| 12.12 (84)
| Brunswick Street Oval
| 35,000
| 6 June 1921
|- bgcolor="#FFFFFF"
| 
| 12.18 (90)
| 
| 13.12 (90)
| Junction Oval
| 20,000
| 6 June 1921

Round 6

|- bgcolor="#CCCCFF"
| Home team
| Home team score
| Away team
| Away team score
| Venue
| Crowd
| Date
|- bgcolor="#FFFFFF"
| 
| 11.13 (79)
| 
| 5.5 (35)
| Corio Oval
| 12,000
| 11 June 1921
|- bgcolor="#FFFFFF"
| 
| 9.13 (67)
| 
| 6.8 (44)
| Victoria Park
| 20,000
| 11 June 1921
|- bgcolor="#FFFFFF"
| 
| 14.11 (95)
| 
| 13.14 (92)
| Punt Road Oval
| 12,000
| 11 June 1921
|- bgcolor="#FFFFFF"
| 
| 7.18 (60)
| 
| 18.9 (117)
| EMCG
| 18,000
| 11 June 1921

Round 7

|- bgcolor="#CCCCFF"
| Home team
| Home team score
| Away team
| Away team score
| Venue
| Crowd
| Date
|- bgcolor="#FFFFFF"
| 
| 17.12 (114)
| 
| 9.10 (64)
| Victoria Park
| 10,000
| 18 June 1921
|- bgcolor="#FFFFFF"
| 
| 11.15 (81)
| 
| 8.13 (61)
| Princes Park
| 40,000
| 18 June 1921
|- bgcolor="#FFFFFF"
| 
| 9.15 (69)
| 
| 4.17 (41)
| MCG
| 11,214
| 18 June 1921
|- bgcolor="#FFFFFF"
| 
| 12.14 (86)
| 
| 10.11 (71)
| Punt Road Oval
| 12,000
| 18 June 1921

Round 8

|- bgcolor="#CCCCFF"
| Home team
| Home team score
| Away team
| Away team score
| Venue
| Crowd
| Date
|- bgcolor="#FFFFFF"
| 
| 5.12 (42)
| 
| 13.11 (89)
| Junction Oval
| 15,000
| 25 June 1921
|- bgcolor="#FFFFFF"
| 
| 10.14 (74)
| 
| 8.5 (53)
| Lake Oval
| 15,000
| 25 June 1921
|- bgcolor="#FFFFFF"
| 
| 12.13 (85)
| 
| 6.10 (46)
| Brunswick Street Oval
| 10,000
| 25 June 1921
|- bgcolor="#FFFFFF"
| 
| 7.13 (55)
| 
| 8.14 (62)
| MCG
| 19,889
| 25 June 1921

Round 9

|- bgcolor="#CCCCFF"
| Home team
| Home team score
| Away team
| Away team score
| Venue
| Crowd
| Date
|- bgcolor="#FFFFFF"
| 
| 11.10 (76)
| 
| 8.16 (64)
| Corio Oval
| 9,000
| 2 July 1921
|- bgcolor="#FFFFFF"
| 
| 5.12 (42)
| 
| 11.17 (83)
| EMCG
| 6,000
| 2 July 1921
|- bgcolor="#FFFFFF"
| 
| 12.16 (88)
| 
| 10.4 (64)
| Princes Park
| 35,000
| 2 July 1921
|- bgcolor="#FFFFFF"
| 
| 8.18 (66)
| 
| 6.12 (48)
| Lake Oval
| 12,000
| 2 July 1921

Round 10

|- bgcolor="#CCCCFF"
| Home team
| Home team score
| Away team
| Away team score
| Venue
| Crowd
| Date
|- bgcolor="#FFFFFF"
| 
| 14.15 (99)
| 
| 6.12 (48)
| Princes Park
| 42,000
| 9 July 1921
|- bgcolor="#FFFFFF"
| 
| 13.9 (87)
| 
| 11.8 (74)
| Lake Oval
| 20,000
| 9 July 1921
|- bgcolor="#FFFFFF"
| 
| 7.12 (54)
| 
| 11.14 (80)
| MCG
| 7,783
| 9 July 1921
|- bgcolor="#FFFFFF"
| 
| 8.18 (66)
| 
| 8.8 (56)
| Brunswick Street Oval
| 12,000
| 9 July 1921

Round 11

|- bgcolor="#CCCCFF"
| Home team
| Home team score
| Away team
| Away team score
| Venue
| Crowd
| Date
|- bgcolor="#FFFFFF"
| 
| 9.12 (66)
| 
| 8.13 (61)
| Punt Road Oval
| 15,000
| 16 July 1921
|- bgcolor="#FFFFFF"
| 
| 2.15 (27)
| 
| 9.18 (72)
| EMCG
| 6,000
| 16 July 1921
|- bgcolor="#FFFFFF"
| 
| 3.14 (32)
| 
| 7.7 (49)
| Victoria Park
| 4,500
| 16 July 1921
|- bgcolor="#FFFFFF"
| 
| 0.18 (18)
| 
| 6.8 (44)
| Junction Oval
| 6,000
| 16 July 1921

Round 12

|- bgcolor="#CCCCFF"
| Home team
| Home team score
| Away team
| Away team score
| Venue
| Crowd
| Date
|- bgcolor="#FFFFFF"
| 
| 8.13 (61)
| 
| 5.13 (43)
| EMCG
| 15,000
| 23 July 1921
|- bgcolor="#FFFFFF"
| 
| 8.12 (60)
| 
| 14.13 (97)
| Punt Road Oval
| 27,000
| 23 July 1921
|- bgcolor="#FFFFFF"
| 
| 10.12 (72)
| 
| 6.11 (47)
| Corio Oval
| 14,000
| 23 July 1921
|- bgcolor="#FFFFFF"
| 
| 5.14 (44)
| 
| 22.10 (142)
| Junction Oval
| 17,000
| 23 July 1921

Round 13

|- bgcolor="#CCCCFF"
| Home team
| Home team score
| Away team
| Away team score
| Venue
| Crowd
| Date
|- bgcolor="#FFFFFF"
| 
| 10.11 (71)
| 
| 2.11 (23)
| Victoria Park
| 4,000
| 30 July 1921
|- bgcolor="#FFFFFF"
| 
| 8.21 (69)
| 
| 7.11 (53)
| Lake Oval
| 5,000
| 30 July 1921
|- bgcolor="#FFFFFF"
| 
| 9.15 (69)
| 
| 5.6 (36)
| Punt Road Oval
| 10,000
| 30 July 1921
|- bgcolor="#FFFFFF"
| 
| 4.15 (39)
| 
| 3.6 (24)
| Brunswick Street Oval
| 15,000
| 30 July 1921

Round 14

|- bgcolor="#CCCCFF"
| Home team
| Home team score
| Away team
| Away team score
| Venue
| Crowd
| Date
|- bgcolor="#FFFFFF"
| 
| 6.20 (56)
| 
| 5.19 (49)
| MCG
| 6,488
| 20 August 1921
|- bgcolor="#FFFFFF"
| 
| 6.10 (46)
| 
| 10.12 (72)
| Victoria Park
| 25,000
| 20 August 1921
|- bgcolor="#FFFFFF"
| 
| 11.15 (81)
| 
| 7.14 (56)
| Princes Park
| 25,000
| 20 August 1921
|- bgcolor="#FFFFFF"
| 
| 13.8 (86)
| 
| 9.10 (64)
| Corio Oval
| 16,000
| 20 August 1921

Round 15

|- bgcolor="#CCCCFF"
| Home team
| Home team score
| Away team
| Away team score
| Venue
| Crowd
| Date
|- bgcolor="#FFFFFF"
| 
| 8.11 (59)
| 
| 12.6 (78)
| MCG
| 13,832
| 27 August 1921
|- bgcolor="#FFFFFF"
| 
| 7.19 (61)
| 
| 7.11 (53)
| Princes Park
| 10,000
| 27 August 1921
|- bgcolor="#FFFFFF"
| 
| 11.16 (82)
| 
| 9.9 (63)
| Junction Oval
| 9,000
| 27 August 1921
|- bgcolor="#FFFFFF"
| 
| 5.10 (40)
| 
| 8.7 (55)
| Lake Oval
| 25,000
| 27 August 1921

Round 16

|- bgcolor="#CCCCFF"
| Home team
| Home team score
| Away team
| Away team score
| Venue
| Crowd
| Date
|- bgcolor="#FFFFFF"
| 
| 9.8 (62)
| 
| 9.9 (63)
| Brunswick Street Oval
| 8,000
| 3 September 1921
|- bgcolor="#FFFFFF"
| 
| 5.15 (45)
| 
| 11.14 (80)
| EMCG
| 14,000
| 3 September 1921
|- bgcolor="#FFFFFF"
| 
| 10.7 (67)
| 
| 12.7 (79)
| Junction Oval
| 16,000
| 3 September 1921
|- bgcolor="#FFFFFF"
| 
| 6.11 (47)
| 
| 8.15 (63)
| Corio Oval
| 24,000
| 3 September 1921

Round 17

|- bgcolor="#CCCCFF"
| Home team
| Home team score
| Away team
| Away team score
| Venue
| Crowd
| Date
|- bgcolor="#FFFFFF"
| 
| 14.11 (95)
| 
| 7.5 (47)
| Punt Road Oval
| 15,000
| 10 September 1921
|- bgcolor="#FFFFFF"
| 
| 10.7 (67)
| 
| 3.10 (28)
| Corio Oval
| 14,000
| 10 September 1921
|- bgcolor="#FFFFFF"
| 
| 10.14 (74)
| 
| 11.8 (74)
| EMCG
| 6,000
| 10 September 1921
|- bgcolor="#FFFFFF"
| 
| 14.16 (100)
| 
| 10.16 (76)
| Princes Park
| 16,000
| 10 September 1921

Round 18

|- bgcolor="#CCCCFF"
| Home team
| Home team score
| Away team
| Away team score
| Venue
| Crowd
| Date
|- bgcolor="#FFFFFF"
| 
| 10.19 (79)
| 
| 6.9 (45)
| Brunswick Street Oval
| 8,000
| 17 September 1921
|- bgcolor="#FFFFFF"
| 
| 16.19 (115)
| 
| 10.11 (71)
| MCG
| 9,789
| 17 September 1921
|- bgcolor="#FFFFFF"
| 
| 14.12 (96)
| 
| 13.16 (94)
| Junction Oval
| 10,000
| 17 September 1921
|- bgcolor="#FFFFFF"
| 
| 5.7 (37)
| 
| 9.10 (64)
| Victoria Park
| 30,000
| 17 September 1921

Ladder

Finals

All of the 1921 finals were played at the MCG so the home team in the semi finals and preliminary final is purely the higher ranked team from the ladder but in the grand final the home team was the team that won the preliminary final.

Semi finals

|- bgcolor="#CCCCFF"
| Home team
| Score
| Away team
| Score
| Venue
| Crowd
| Date
|- bgcolor="#FFFFFF"
| 
| 16.19 (115)
| 
| 6.18 (54)
| MCG
| 41,649
| 24 September
|- bgcolor="#FFFFFF"
| 
| 9.11 (65)
| Collingwood
| 7.10 (52)
| MCG
| 37,813
| 1 October

Preliminary final

|- bgcolor="#CCCCFF"
| Home team
| Score
| Away team
| Score
| Venue
| Crowd
| Date
|- bgcolor="#FFFFFF"
| 
| 10.7 (67)
| 
| 7.17 (59)
| MCG
| 42,866
| 8 October

Grand final

Richmond defeated Carlton 5.6 (36) to 4.8 (32), in front of a crowd of 43,122 people. (For an explanation of scoring see Australian rules football).

Awards
 The 1921 VFL Premiership team was Richmond.
 The VFL's leading goalkicker was Cliff Rankin of Geelong with 61 goals.
 Essendon took the "wooden spoon" in 1921.
 The Victorian Junior League premiership, which is today recognised as the VFL reserves premiership, was won by 's team, Essendon Juniors. Essendon Juniors 10.9 (69) defeated Collingwood District 8.13 (61) in the challenge Grand Final, played as a curtain-raiser to the senior Grand Final on 15 October at the Melbourne Cricket Ground.

Notable events

 Umpires demand that the VFL provides greater protection, including the wire netting of the umpire's race to the ground (in order to protect them from fists, projectiles and, particularly, ladies' hat-pins) and a stronger police guard.
 In the last quarter of the Round 7 match between Richmond and Essendon at the Punt Road Oval, Richmond had kicked a point. The ball was returned from the crowd to the Essendon full-back Bert Day who was on the boundary line, not the goal line. The ball had been stabbed by someone in the crowd. Day, noticing the deflated condition of the ball, kicked it idly from the boundary line over to the field Umpire (E. P. Willamson) to inspect. Richmond full-forward George Bayliss pounced on the ball and kicked a goal with it. Day's kick from the boundary line was mistakenly treated as if it had been a kick out from the goal line and, despite all of Essendon's protests, a goal was awarded to Bayliss.
 In Round 11, St Kilda failed to score a goal, and lost badly to a Fitzroy team that had four fewer scoring shots: Fitzroy 6.8 (44) to St Kilda 0.18 (18).
 Prior to the Round 12 match between St Kilda and Carlton, a "ladies" football match was played between two female teams, "The Chorleys" and "The Fleetwoods", to the delight of the crowd. The Fleetwoods won 4.2 (26) to 2.4 (16). Whilst the women played in men's guernseys, shorts, socks, boots, etc. the (male) field umpire wore a dress.
 The fourth Australian Football Carnival was held in Perth. Western Australia were the Australian Champions.
 In Round 17, Essendon played its last match at the East Melbourne Cricket Ground, before the ground was closed to make way for an expansion of the Flinders Street railyards. During the season, the club made arrangements to find a new home base for 1922, initially looking to move to the North Melbourne Recreation Reserve, and finally settling on the Essendon Recreation Reserve when a move to North Melbourne was blocked.
 The Preliminary Final on 8 October, played between Richmond and Carlton, was played in deep mud, and the second half was delayed until a driving hail-storm, that had turned the Melbourne Cricket Ground's playing surface white, had passed. The second half was played with the surface covered with pools of water six inches deep. (The VFA preliminary final, played at the nearby East Melbourne Cricket Ground, was abandoned in the third quarter and replayed the following week due to the same hail-storm).
 The five drawn matches during the 1921 season remains a VFL/AFL record for most draws in one season.

References

 Hogan, P., The Tigers of Old, The Richmond Football Club, (Richmond), 1996. 
 Maplestone, M., Flying Higher: History of the Essendon Football Club 1872–1996, Essendon Football Club, (Melbourne), 1996. 
 Rogers, S. & Brown, A., Every Game Ever Played: VFL/AFL Results 1897–1997 (Sixth Edition), Viking Books, (Ringwood), 1998. 
 Ross, J. (ed), 100 Years of Australian Football 1897–1996: The Complete Story of the AFL, All the Big Stories, All the Great Pictures, All the Champions, Every AFL Season Reported, Viking, (Ringwood), 1996.

External links
 1921 Season - AFL Tables

Australian Football League seasons
VFL season